The Port Washington Fire Engine House is located in Port Washington, Wisconsin. It was added to the National Register of Historic Places in 2009.

History
The fire engine house was built in 1929 next to the site of the city's previous firehouse, which had been built in 1884. The 1929 building was designed by John Topzant of Milwaukee in Mediterranean Revival style, with a red-tile roof and a hose-drying tower. It initially contained garages for fire engines, living quarters for the firemen, and a repair room.

A 1.5-story addition was built onto the back of the station between 1929 and 1938. The station remained in operation until a larger firehouse was built across the street in 1975. Then a senior citizens center took up residence in the older house.

References

External links
 Wisconsin Historical Society page with more color photos

Fire stations completed in 1929
Government buildings completed in 1929
Fire stations on the National Register of Historic Places in Wisconsin
Defunct fire stations in Wisconsin
Buildings and structures in Ozaukee County, Wisconsin
Mediterranean Revival architecture in Wisconsin
National Register of Historic Places in Ozaukee County, Wisconsin
1929 establishments in Wisconsin